The 2017–18 Super League Greece, or Souroti Super League for sponsorship reasons, was the 82nd season of the highest tier in league of Greek football and the 12th under its current name. The season started in August 2017 and ended in May 2018. The league comprises fourteen teams from the 2016–17 season and two promoted from the 2016–17 Football League.

On 12 March 2018, the Super League Greece was suspended by the Greek government until further notice after the president of PAOK, Ivan Savvidis, had stormed onto the field with a revolver during the match between PAOK and AEK Athens played the previous day. The suspension was lifted on 27 March. PAOK was deducted 3 points and AEK was awarded 3 points for the incident.

Contrary to the previous seasons, the playoffs for the Champions League and Europa League spots were removed, with qualification based solely on finishing position.

Teams
Two teams were relegated from the 2016–17 season. Iraklis and Veria played in Football League for the 2017–18 season.

Two teams were promoted from the 2016–17 Football League, Apollon Smyrnis and Lamia, the latter for which it was their debut season in the highest division of Greek football.

Stadiums and locations

Personnel and kits

Note: Flags indicate national team as has been defined under FIFA eligibility rules. Players and Managers may hold more than one non-FIFA nationality.

Managerial changes

League table

Results

Positions by round

The table lists the positions of teams after each week of matches. In order to preserve chronological evolvements, any postponed matches are not included in the round at which they were originally scheduled, but added to the full round they were played immediately afterwards.

Season statistics

Top scorers

Top assists

Best goal and MVP awards winners

Awards

Annual awards
Annual awards were announced on 15 February 2019.

Team of the Year

References

External links
Official website 

Greece
1
A1 Ethniki
A1 Ethniki
2017-18